Jaago is a 2010 Bangladeshi sports drama film written and directed by Khijir Hayat Khan. The film features Ferdous and Bindu in lead roles and with supporting Arifin Shuvoo, Sharlin Farzana, Tariq Anam Khan, Rawnak Hasan, FS Nayeem and many more. It claims to be the first Bangladeshi film based entirely on football or any other sports. The story of Jaago is said to be inspired by the Shadhin Bangla football team, who raised funds during the Liberation War (1971) through charity matches and lifted the morale of the freedom fighters.

Plot
Every year, Comilla XI plays friendly football match against India's Tripura XI. But unfortunately they lost every match over the years. But this year they had a strong team, led by Shamim (Ferdous Ahmed) who is very passionate about football. He, along with local boys runs a football academy named Azad Boys. He requests former Shadhin Bangla Football Team member Safu Bhai (Tariq Anam Khan) to coach the team. But he rejects and says football doesn't give you anything. But one day, members of Comilla XI met a road accident. All the players were wounded and some of them died. But captain of Tripura XI talked dishonourably that it saved their time mentioning they would've won the match very easily. As a result, amateurs of Azad boys Dared to dream and wanted to play re-match. Regarding their bravery Safu agreed to coach them. They practiced hard and played with real hearts to save the pride of Comilla.

Cast 
 Ferdous as Shamim
 Bindu as Maya
 Arifin Shuvoo as Rafi
 Sharlin Farzana as Ruksana Anjuman
 Tariq Anam Khan as coach Saffu
 Rawnak Hasan as Tuhin
 Nusrat Daina as Reshma
 Jashimuddin Palash as Mesba
 Bachchu as Suruz Ali
 Ferdousi Ara Lina as Shamim's mother
 Dicon Noor as Rafi's father
 Jatika Jyoti
 Saraf Ahmed Zibon as Mesba's brother
 Khijir Hayat Khan as Munna

Awards and nominations 
Jaago received fifteen nominations and received six awards at the Film Award Bangla 2010 in the following categories: Best Film (Critics' Choice); Best Director (Khijir Hayat Khan); Best Music Director (Arnob); Best Actress (Bindu); Best Playback Singer Male (Kumar Bishwajit for "Jhum Jhum Brishti") and Best Sound Engineer (Bappi Rahman).

Music 
The film includes a total of five songs written by Arnob and Anup Mukhopaddhay and rearranged by Arnob. The film features Kumar Bishwajit, Bappa Mazumder, Arnob, Zohad, Audit, Milon Mahmud and others as playback singers.

See also
 Eito Prem
 Rani Kuthir Baki Itihash

References

Further reading

External links
 
 Jaago on Bangla Movie Database

2010 films
2010s sports drama films
Bengali-language Bangladeshi films
Bangladeshi association football films
Bangladeshi sports drama films
Films scored by Arnob
2010s Bengali-language films
2010 drama films
Films shot in Comilla